Nigerian locomotive classes include:

Steam

Tender 

(number range incomplete)
 River class locomotive - 2-8-2 #174-#217
 101 2-8-0 Gold Coast
 101 0-8-0T Rebuilt
 101 2-8-2 River 1948
 151 4-8-0 	 	
 211 4-8-0 	 	
 244 4-8-0 	
 255 4-8-0  	
 301 4-8-0 	 	
 401 4-6-0  	
 405 4-6-2 	 	
 451 4-6-4T  	
 501 4-6-2+2-6-4 Garratt
 601 4-8-0  	
 651 2-8-2 USATC S118
 671 4-8-0 Ex 244
 701 4-8-2 	 	
 751 2-8-2 Nfd Ry 1020
 801 2-8-2 	 	
 806 4-8-2 		
 901 4-8-2+2-8-4 Garratt

Tank 

(number range imperfect)

 1 0-6-0T	 	
 31 0-6-0T 	
 41 2-6-2T  	
 71 0-8-0T
 74 0-8-0T Hunslet 1947

Diesel

Mainline 

 1001
Builder - English Electric

Date Introduced - 1955

Engine - English Electric SRKT - 676 hp

Maximum Speed - 

Wheel Arrangement - Bo-Bo

Weight (in Working Order) - 52.76 Tons

Number in Class - 10
 1101  - 1125
Builder - Electro Motive Division of General Motors

Date Introduced - 1958

Engine - EMD 12-567C - 1310 hp

Maximum Speed - 50 mph

Wheel Arrangement - A1A-A1A

Weight (in Working Order) - 78.5 Tons

Number in Class - 25
 1126
Builder - Electro Motive Division of General Motors

Date Introduced - 1977

Engine - EMD 12-645E - 1500 hp

Maximum Speed - (Not Known)

Wheel Arrangement - Co-Co

Weight (in Working Order) - 80 Tons

Number in Class - 30
 1201 - 1207
Builder - Mak

Date Introduced - 1961

Engine - MaK MA301FAK - 1170 hp

Maximum Speed - 50 mph

Wheel Arrangement - A1A-A1A

Weight (in Working Order) - 65.98 Tons

Number in Class - 7 (8th Delivered in 1962)
 1401
Builder - AEI / Metropolitan Vickers

Date Introduced - 1966

Engine - Sulzer LDA28C - 1300 hp

Maximum Speed - 43 mph

Wheel Arrangement - Co-Co

Weight (in Working Order) - 77.85 Tons

Number in Class - 27+2
 1601
Builder - Hitachi

Date Introduced - 1972

Engine - MAN 6V 22/30ATL - 1500 hp

Maximum Speed - (Not Known)

Wheel Arrangement - 1Co-Co1

Weight (in Working Order) - 80 Tons

Number in Class - 12
 1701
Builder - Montreal Locomotive Works (Bombardier Inc)

Date Introduced - 1972

Engine - ALCO 8.251E - 1500 hp

Maximum Speed - (Not Known)

Wheel Arrangement - 1Co-Co1

Weight (in Working Order) - 99.41 Tons

Number in Class - 54
 1801
Builder - General Electric (USA)

Date Introduced - 1976

Engine - GE - FDL-12 - 2200 hp

Maximum Speed - (Not Known)

Wheel Arrangement - Co-Co

Weight (in Working Order) - 91.55 Tons

Number in Class - 6
 1807
Builder - General Electric (USA)

Date Introduced - 1977

Engine - GE FDL-8 - 1820 hp

Maximum Speed - (Not Known)

Wheel Arrangement - Co-Co

Weight (in Working Order) - 82.13 Tons

Number in Class - 45
 1901
Builder - ABB

Date Introduced - 1992

Engine - EMD 12-645E3B - 1750 hp (Assumed)

Maximum Speed - (Not Known)

Wheel Arrangement - Co-Co

Weight (in Working Order) - 100 Tons (Assumed)

Number in Class - 10
 2001
Builder - Hyundai - Based on an EMD design

Date Introduced - After 1991

Engine - EMD 12-645E3B (Assumed)

Maximum Speed - (Not Known)

Wheel Arrangement - Co-Co

Weight (in Working Order) - (Not Known)

Number in Class - 5
 2101 - 2150
Builder - Dalian Locomotive and Rolling Stock Works, China

Date Introduced - 1996 to 99

Engine - Type Not Known - 3000 hp

Maximum Speed - 120 km/h (75 mph)

Wheel Arrangement - Co-Co

Weight (in Working Order) - 90 Tons

Number in Class - 50

Shunting

 901
Builder - MaK

Date Introduced - 1958

Engine - MaK MS304 - 388 hp

Maximum Speed - (Not Known)

Wheel Arrangement - 0-6-0DH

Weight (in Working Order) - 40.1 Tons

Number in Class - 15
 921
Builder - Brush Traction

Date Introduced - 1973/8

Engine - Ruston Paxman RPHXL MK7 - 364 hp

Maximum Speed - (Not Known)

Wheel Arrangement - 0-6-0DE

Weight (in Working Order) - 39.5 Tons

Number in Class - 42
 891
Builder - North British

Date Introduced - 1963

Engine - Paxman RPHL

Maximum Speed - (Not Known)

Wheel Arrangement - 0-8-0DH

Weight (in Working Order) - Tons

Number in Class - 2

On order 

 GE - 25 - due 2010

References

External links 
 NR Class List
 NRC Locomotives

Locomotive classes
Railway locomotive-related lists